Events from the year 1675 in art.

Events
Joseph Parrocel settles in Paris, where he will make his reputation as a painter.
Sculptor Balthasar Permoser goes to Florence to work for Giovanni Battista Foggini.

Paintings

Giovanni Domenico Cerrini – The Virgin Mary Triumphing over Heresy and Fall of the Rebel Angels (ceiling fresco, Santa Maria della Vittoria, Rome)
Claude – The Landing of Aeneas
Jan de Bray – The governors of the guild of St. Luke, Haarlem, 1675 (the painters' guild)
Cornelis Norbertus Gysbrechts
Quodlibet
Trompe-l'œil with violin, painter's implements and self-portrait
Jan Siberechts – A View of Longleat
John Michael Wright – Triple portrait of the actor John Lacy in character

Births
February 7 - Hugh Howard, Irish portrait-painter and collector of works of art (died 1737)
April 29 – Giovanni Antonio Pellegrini, Italian decorative and mural painter from Venice (died 1741)
June 23 – Louis de Silvestre, French painter (died 1760)
October 7 - Rosalba Carriera, Venetian Rococo painter especially of portrait miniatures (died 1757)
date unknown
Francesco Ange, Italian painter (died 1757)
Aureliano Milani, Italian painter and teacher in Bologna (died 1749)
Giuseppe Zola, Italian painter of landscapes with small figures (died 1744)
probable
Charles Jervas, Irish portrait painter, translator, and art collector (died 1739)
James Thornhill, English history painter (died 1734)

Deaths
January – Jacob van Huchtenburg, Dutch painter (born 1644)
February 9
Gerrit Dou (or Gerard Dow), Dutch painter especially of genre paintings (born 1613)
Ambrosius Brueghel, Flemish painter (born 1617)
April 25 – Claude Lefebvre, French painter and engraver (born 1633)
May 27 – Gaspard Dughet, French painter (born 1613)
May 30 - José Antolínez, Spanish painter of the Baroque period (born 1635)
August 15 – Pietro Ricchi, Italian painter of the altarpiece for a church in Lucca (born 1606)
October – Hendrick Cornelisz. van Vliet, Dutch painter especially of church interiors (born 1611/1612)
November – Allaert van Everdingen, Dutch painter and printmaker in etching and mezzotint (born 1621)
November 14  (or 1680) – Ercole Procaccini, Italian painter of altarpieces, later director of the academy established by the Procaccini (died 1605)
December 13 - Francesco Vaccaro, Italian painter of landscapes and engraver (born 1636)
December 15 – Johannes Vermeer, Dutch painter (born 1632)
 date unknown
 Carlo Biffi, Italian painter of the Baroque period (born 1605)
 Francesco Boschi, Italian painter, active mainly in Florence (born 1619)
 Filippo Brizzi, Italian painter (born 1603)
 Giovanni Battista Caccioli, Italian figure painter in quadratura (born 1623)
 Antonio Vela Cobo, Spanish Baroque painter, sculptor and gilder (born 1629)
 Vincenzo Dandini, Italian painter of the Baroque period active in Florence (born 1607)
 Hans Ulrich Franck, German historical painter and etcher (born 1603)
 Andrea di Leone, Italian painter of battle scenes (born 1596)
 Jacob Levecq, Dutch Golden Age painter (born 1634)
 Abraham van Diepenbeeck, Dutch painter of the Flemish School (born 1596)
 Lucas Vorsterman, Dutch Baroque engraver (born 1595)
probable
 Pedro de Campolargo, Flemish-born Spanish painter and engraver (born 1605)
 Domenico Gargiulo, Italian painter of landscapes (born 1609/1610)
 Pieter Neeffs II, Flemish Baroque painter who specialized in architectural interiors of churches (born 1620)
 Jacob Willemszoon de Wet, Dutch painter (born 1610)

 
Years of the 17th century in art
1670s in art